Samuel Evans may refer to:

 Samuel Evans (VC) (c. 1821–1901), Scottish recipient of the Victoria Cross
 Satyananda Stokes (1882–1946), Samuel Evans Stokes, apple grower and freedom fighter
 Samuel Evans (Texas politician), Texas state representative, 1865–1870 in Eleventh Texas Legislature; Texas state senator, 1870–1874 in Twelfth Texas Legislature
 Samuel B. Evans (1812–1836), Alamo defender
 Samuel Thomas Evans (1859–1918), Welsh politician
 Samuel Evans (naval officer), commander of USS Hornet and later of Brooklyn Navy Yard

See also
 Sam Evans (disambiguation)